Kristie Moore (born April 22, 1979) is a Canadian curler from Sexsmith, Alberta. She was the alternate player on the Canadian women's team at the 2010 Winter Olympics. She was five months pregnant at the time, making her only the third Olympic athlete to be pregnant during Olympic competition. The first was Swedish figure skater Magda Julin back in 1920, and the second was German skeleton racer Diane Sartor in the 2006 Winter Olympics.

Career
She is a former Canadian and World Junior Champion. In 1996, playing second for Heather Nedohin (Godberson), she won both the 1996 Canadian Junior Curling Championships and the World Junior Curling Championships.

In 1999, Moore teamed up again with Nedohin. In 2000, she won her first provincial championship. At the 2000 Scott Tournament of Hearts, the team finished with a 6-5 record.

She took time off from curling from 2004 to 2006 before returning to the Nedohin team once again. She left the team in 2009 to play second for Renelle Bryden, which was her regular skip. She would team up with Renee Sonnenberg in 2010 playing second, until she left to form her own team at the end of the 2011-2012 season.

Moore and her rink of Blaine de Jager, Michelle Dykstra and Amber Cheveldale won the 2013 Alberta Scotties Tournament of Hearts. The team represented Alberta at the 2013 Scotties Tournament of Hearts, and finished with a 1-10 record, in last place.

Personal life
Moore grew up in DeBolt, Alberta. She currently works as a massage therapist for Sexsmith Physiotherapy. She is married to Shane Wray and has three children.

Grand Slam record

Former events

References

External links

1979 births
Living people
Canadian women curlers
Curlers at the 2010 Winter Olympics
Curlers from Alberta
Olympic silver medalists for Canada
Olympic curlers of Canada
Olympic medalists in curling
People from Grande Prairie
Medalists at the 2010 Winter Olympics
Canada Cup (curling) participants
20th-century Canadian women
21st-century Canadian women